Qutani (Aymara quta lake, -ni a suffix, "the one with a lake", also spelled Khotani) is a mountain in the Bolivian Andes which reaches a height of approximately . It is located in the La Paz Department, Loayza Province, Luribay Municipality, northwest of Luribay. Qutani lies southeast of Wila Quta.

References 

Mountains of La Paz Department (Bolivia)